The 2018 AFC U-19 Championship was the 40th edition of the biennial international youth football championship organised by the Asian Football Confederation (AFC) for the men's under-19 national teams of Asia. It took place in Indonesia, which was appointed as the host by the AFC on 25 July 2017, between 18 October and 4 November 2018. A total of 16 teams played in the tournament.

The top four teams of the tournament qualified for the 2019 FIFA U-20 World Cup in Poland as the AFC representatives. Saudi Arabia won their third title, and qualified together with runners-up South Korea and semi-finalists Qatar and Japan, which were the defending champions but eliminated by Saudi Arabia.

Qualification

Qualification process
Qualification matches were played between 24 October and 8 November 2017.

Although Indonesia had already qualified automatically as hosts, they also participated in the qualifiers and finished third place after going down 0–3 and 1–4 loss to South Korea and Malaysia sides respectively.

Chinese Taipei returned to the tournament finals for the first time since 1974 as one of the best group runners-up.

The 2018 qualifiers also witnessed a unique situation where two teams had to go to penalties to determine the higher-position team. It happened in  Group C after Qatar and Iraq were tied in all tie-breaking criteria and both of them played among each other in the last match. Qatar won the penalties and finished top of the group while Iraq finished second.

Twelve out of 2018 qualified sixteen teams played in the 2016 finals.

Qualified teams
The following 16 teams qualified for the final tournament.

Venues
The matches were played in three venues around Greater Jakarta.

Draw
The draw was held on 18 May 2018, 15:00 WIB (UTC+7), at the Fairmont Hotel in Jakarta. The 16 teams were drawn into four groups of four teams. The teams were seeded according to their performance in the 2016 AFC U-19 Championship final tournament and qualification, with the hosts Indonesia automatically seeded and assigned to Position A1 in the draw.

Squads

Players born on or after 1 January 1999 were eligible to compete in the tournament. Each team must register a squad of minimum 18 players and maximum 23 players, minimum three of whom must be goalkeepers.

Group stage
The top two teams of each group advanced to the quarter-finals.

Tiebreakers
Teams were ranked according to points (3 points for a win, 1 point for a draw, 0 points for a loss), and if tied on points, the following tie-breaking criteria were applied, in the order given, to determine the rankings:
Points in head-to-head matches among tied teams;
Goal difference in head-to-head matches among tied teams;
Goals scored in head-to-head matches among tied teams;
If more than two teams are tied, and after applying all head-to-head criteria above, a subset of teams are still tied, all head-to-head criteria above are reapplied exclusively to this subset of teams;
Goal difference in all group matches;
Goals scored in all group matches;
Penalty shoot-out if only two teams were tied and they met in the last round of the group;
Disciplinary points (yellow card = 1 point, red card as a result of two yellow cards = 3 points, direct red card = 3 points, yellow card followed by direct red card = 4 points);
Drawing of lots.

All times are local, WIB (UTC+7).

Group A

Group B

Group C

Group D

Knockout stage
In the knockout stage, extra time and penalty shoot-out are used to decide the winner if necessary.

Bracket

Quarter-finals
Winners qualified for the 2019 FIFA U-20 World Cup.

Semi-finals

Final

Winners

Awards
The following awards were given at the conclusion of the tournament:

Goalscorers

Qualified teams for FIFA U-20 World Cup
The following four teams from AFC qualified for the 2019 FIFA U-20 World Cup.

1 Bold indicates champions for that year. Italic indicates hosts for that year.

Concerns and controversies
An error was made before the start of Jordan–South Korea Group C match on 22 October 2018, where the operator played North Korean national anthem instead of South Korean national anthem. The wrong anthem was stopped immediately and the operator has since been replaced.

References

External links
, the-AFC.com
AFC U-19 Championship 2018, stats.the-AFC.com

 
2018
U-19 Championship
2018 in youth association football
2019 FIFA U-20 World Cup qualification
2018 AFC U-19 Championship
October 2018 sports events in Asia
November 2018 sports events in Asia